Apowollastonia stirlingii is a flowering plant in the family Asteraceae and is endemic to Australia. It is a small, upright herb with yellow daisy-like flowers.

Description
The green branches rough with hard protrusions, ridged and lower parts woody.

Taxonomy and naming
The species was first described by  Ralph Tate as Wedelia stirlingii. In 2013 Anthony Edward Orchard changed the name to Apowollastonia stirlingii and the description was published in the journal Nuytsia.The specific epithet (stirlingii) was named in honour of Edward Charles Stirling.

Distribution and habitat
Apowollastonia stirlingii grows on grassy woodlands, gullies and rocky locations in South Australia, Western Australia and the Northern Territory.

References

Gnaphalieae
Asterales of Australia
Flora of the Northern Territory
Flora of South Australia
Eudicots of Western Australia